Princess and the Seven Kung Fu Masters (Chinese: 笑功震武林) is a 2013 Hong Kong martial arts comedy film directed by Wong Jing.

Cast
Sammo Hung
Sandra Ng
Ronald Cheng
Eric Tsang
Wong Cho Lam
Xie Na
Philip Ng
Kimmy Tong
Yuen Wah
Rose Chan
Natalie Meng
Xing Yu
Jiang Luxia
Jo Kuk
Timmy Hung
Dennis To
Wan Chiu

Reception
Andrew Chan of the Film Critics Circle of Australia writes, "The result is easily winning the audience attention through some truly funny gags and quality kung fu on display."

Princess and the Seven Kung Fu Masters earned HK$3,184,910 at the Hong Kong box office.

References

External links
 

2013 films
Hong Kong action comedy films
Hong Kong martial arts comedy films
Kung fu films
2013 action comedy films
2010s Cantonese-language films
Films directed by Wong Jing
2013 martial arts films
2010s Hong Kong films